I Liked Kissing Women is a 1926 German silent film directed by  and starring Alfons Fryland, Elisabeth Pinajeff, and Evi Eva.

The film's sets were designed by the art director Carl Ludwig Kirmse.

Cast

References

External links

Films of the Weimar Republic
Films directed by Bruno Rahn
German silent feature films
German black-and-white films